Jay Lewis Turner (July 11, 1914 – November 1960) was an American football running back in the National Football League for the Washington Redskins.  He attended George Washington University.

1914 births
1960 deaths
Sportspeople from Springfield, Missouri
American football running backs
George Washington Colonials football players
Washington Redskins players
Wilmington Clippers players